The Royal Film Commission – Jordan (RFC) was established to develop an internationally competitive Jordanian film industry.

Founded in accordance with the Royal Film Commission Law No. 27 in 2003 and approved by Law No. 22 in 2008, RFC is a financially and administratively autonomous Jordanian government organization led by a Board of Commissioners chaired by Prince Ali Bin Al-Hussein. Noted Jordanian artist Ali Maher served as the film commissioner of the organization prior to his passing.

The RFC is a member of the Association of Film Commissioners International (AFCI). The (AFCI) is the official professional and educational organization for film commissions. AFCI Members assist feature, television, commercial, industrial and photography production throughout the world.

The Location Managers Guild recognized the RFC with the LMGI Award for Outstanding Film Commission in 2017 for its work on Rogue One: A Star Wars Story, which filmed at Wadi Rum. The RFC had previously been nominated for its work on The Martian.

References

Film commissions
Film organisations in Jordan